Jason Gerardo Cirone (born February 21, 1971) is a Canadian-born Italian former professional ice hockey centre. He played for the Winnipeg Jets of the National Hockey League and is the former head coach of the Metro Jets of the North American 3 Hockey League. He is the former head coach of the Midland University Men's hockey team in Fremont, Nebraska. Internationally Cirone represented Italy at several World Championships and at the 2006 Winter Olympics.

Playing career
As a youth, Cirone played in the 1984 Quebec International Pee-Wee Hockey Tournament with a minor ice hockey team from Don Mills.

Cirone was drafted by the Winnipeg Jets in the third round (46th overall) in the 1989 NHL Entry Draft.  He played junior hockey for the Cornwall Royals and Windsor Spitfires of the Ontario Hockey League.  Cirone appeared in 3 games with the Jets during the 1991-92 season.

On August, 1993, the Jets traded Cirone to the Florida Panthers in exchange for forward Dave Tomlinson.

Cirone had a successful career in minor league hockey.  He played for the Moncton Hawks and Rochester Americans of the American Hockey League; and the Cincinnati Cyclones, Los Angeles Ice Dogs, Kansas City Blades, and Flint Generals of the International Hockey League.  In 2006-07 he was a player-assistant coach with the Rio Grande Valley Killer Bees of the Central Hockey League.  Cirone had two stints overseas for Asiago HC on the Italian Ice Hockey League in 1992-93 and then again from 2001-2006, and the Frankfurt Lions of the German Ice Hockey League in 2000-01.  Cirone also spent two seasons playing roller hockey for the Buffalo Stampede in 1994 and 1995.

Cirone holds an Italian passport, and played in the 2006 Winter Olympics in Turin, Italy as a member of the Italian team.

Coaching career
Cirone is currently the head coach of the Midland University Men's Hockey team located in Fremont, Nebraska from 2013 to 2021. Cirone was previously the head coach of the Metro Jets of the North American 3 Hockey League located in Waterford, Michigan.  He also had previously served as an assistant coach for the Jets.

https://www.midlandathletics.com/roster/11/40/11691.php

Career statistics

Regular season and playoffs

International

References

External links

1971 births
Living people
Asiago Hockey 1935 players
Birmingham Bulls (ECHL) players
Buffalo Stampede players
Canadian people of Italian descent
Canadian ice hockey centres
Cincinnati Cyclones (IHL) players
Cornwall Royals players
Flint Generals players
Frankfurt Lions players
Ice hockey players at the 2006 Winter Olympics
Kansas City Blades players
Long Beach Ice Dogs (IHL) players
Los Angeles Ice Dogs players
Moncton Hawks players
Olympic ice hockey players of Italy
Rio Grande Valley Killer Bees players
Rochester Americans players
Ice hockey people from Toronto
Windsor Spitfires players
Winnipeg Jets (1979–1996) draft picks
Winnipeg Jets (1979–1996) players